Joss Christensen (born December 20, 1991) is an American freestyle skier from Park City, Utah. Christensen's highest sports accomplishment to date is winning a gold medal at the 2014 Winter Olympics in Sochi, Russia.

References

External links
 
 
 
 
 

1991 births
Living people
American male freestyle skiers
Olympic freestyle skiers of the United States
Freestyle skiers at the 2014 Winter Olympics
Medalists at the 2014 Winter Olympics
Olympic gold medalists for the United States in freestyle skiing
People from Park City, Utah
X Games athletes